The 12th NKP Salve Challenger Trophy was an Indian domestic cricket tournament that was held in Chennai from 1 October to 4 October 2006. The series involved the domestic players from India who were placed accordingly in the teams namely India Blue, India Red, and India Green. From this edition, the names of teams were changed from the previous edition where India Seniors, India A, and India B became India Blue, India Red, and India Green respectively.

The trophy was jointly shared by India Blue and India Red after the final was abandoned due to rain.

Squads

 Mithun Manhas replaced VVS Laxman in the India Green squad, after he was ruled out due to a strained hamstring ahead of the tournament.

Points Table

Matches

Group stage

Final

References

Indian domestic cricket competitions
2006 in sports